The Monument to Columbus (Spanish: Monumento a Colón) is an instance of public art in Salamanca, Spain. The monument, dedicated to Christopher Columbus, is erected on the centre of the namesake plaza.

History and description 
The idea for the erection of the monument was part of the series of initiatives in Spain intending to commemorate the 400th anniversary of the arrival of Columbus to the Americas. A work by Eduardo Barrón and standing 3.30 metre high, the statue representing Columbus was cast in bronze. The location chosen for the monument was the Plaza de los Menores, that from then on, it became known as "plaza de Colón". Building works started in 1892.

The State, the province and the municipality"), while the lateral sides incorporate two reliefs depicting the busts of Diego de Deza and Isabella of Castile.

It was unveiled on 9 September 1893.

In popular culture 
The finger-pointing statue helped to create a folkloric ditty: ¿Hacia dónde apunta Colón? A la calle de Pan y Carbón ("Where is Columbus pointing? To the Street of Bread and Coal").

References 
Citations

Bibliography
 

Monuments and memorials in Castile and León
Outdoor sculptures in Castile and León
Sculptures of men in Spain
Statues of Christopher Columbus
Monuments and memorials to Christopher Columbus
Buildings and structures in Salamanca
Bronze sculptures in Spain
Columbus